The 2011 Six Nations Championship, known as the 2011 RBS 6 Nations due to sponsorship by the Royal Bank of Scotland, was the 12th series of the Six Nations Championship, and the 117th edition of the international championship. The annual rugby union tournament was contested by England, France, Ireland, Italy, Scotland and Wales, and was won by England.

Ireland played their first Six Nations games at the Aviva Stadium, having played their first matches at the new stadium in November 2010.

For the first time in its history, the tournament opened with a Friday night fixture. For the first time in a decade, all of the teams had the same head coach as in the previous year's tournament.

This tournament was also notable for a major upset, with Italy beating 2010 champions France. Despite this upset, Italy still finished last, and was awarded the wooden spoon as a result. The champions were England, who won their first four matches, but were denied the Grand Slam and the Triple Crown by a defeat to Ireland.

Italy's Andrea Masi was named the Six Nations Player of the Championship, becoming the first Italian player to win the award with 30% of the voting. The runners up were Fabio Semenzato in second, Seán O'Brien in third and Toby Flood in fourth.

Final results
England won the championship after winning four out of their five matches, losing against Ireland. Due to France defeating Wales in the final match of the tournament, England ended the tournament at the top of the table. Had England beaten Ireland it would have led to their first Grand Slam since 2003. Italy lost their final match against Scotland to claim the wooden spoon for the ninth time since entering the competition in 2000.

Participants
The teams involved are:

Squads
See 2011 Six Nations Championship squads.

Table

Results

Round 1

Tom Wood (England) made his international debut.

Fergus McFadden (Ireland) made his international debut.

Round 2

 Chris Ashton's four-try performance marked a number of milestones:
 He became the first player of any nation to score four tries in a Six Nations match since the competition expanded in  2000.
 He also became the first England player to have scored four tries in a Six Nations, Five Nations, or Home Nations match since Ronald Poulton-Palmer scored four against France in 1914.
 His six tries in the tournament equalled the single-season record in the Six Nations era, shared by Will Greenwood of England in  2001 and Shane Williams of Wales in  2008.
Carlo Del Fava earned his 50th cap
Alex Corbisiero (England) and Fabio Semenzato (Italy) made their international debuts.

Josh Turnbull and Rhys Priestland (both Wales) made their international debuts.

Round 3

Alessandro Zanni (Italy) and James Hook (Wales) each earned their 50th caps.

Dimitri Yachvili (France) earned his 50th cap.
Jonny Wilkinson's 52nd-minute penalty for England made him the leading point scorer in international rugby, overtaking Dan Carter.

Round 4

Carlo Festuccia earned his 50th cap
This was the first time Italy had ever beaten France at home, and the first time they had won the Giuseppe Garibaldi Trophy.

Mike Phillips (Wales) earned his 50th cap.
 Brian O'Driscoll's try gave him 24 career tries in the Championship, equalling the all-time record of Ian Smith of Scotland, amassed in the Five Nations and Home Nations between 1924 and 1933.
 Ronan O'Gara became the fifth player in rugby history with 1,000 career Test points, reaching the mark with his conversion of O'Driscoll's try.
 The officials were heavily criticised for allowing the Wales try as it was scored following a quick throw-in after the ball went out on the full, with a different ball. A quick throw-in must be taken with the same ball without it being touched after going over the touchline.

In the 58th minute, referee Poite was replaced by Jérôme Garcès due to injury. Andrew Small (England) replaced Garcès as touch judge.

Round 5

 Scotland's victory lifted them from the bottom of the table and condemned Italy to a fourth consecutive wooden spoon.
 De Luca's try was the first for Scotland at Murrayfield for nearly two years.

 Brian O'Driscoll's try against England took his all-time championship tally up to 25, breaking the record held by Ian Smith since  1933.
Denis Leamy (Ireland) and Mark Cueto (England) each earned their 50th caps.

 Wales needed to beat France by 27 points to clinch the title.
 Ryan Jones (Wales) earned his 50th cap.

Top scorers

Try scorers

Points scorers

Media coverage
In the United Kingdom, BBC channels televised the matches live. The matches were also televised by France 2 in France, RTÉ Two in Ireland, Sky Sport in Italy and ESPN in Australia and New Zealand.

In Wales, Welsh language channel S4C televised Wales matches live.

In the United States and the Caribbean, Premium Sports televised the matches live while in the United States, BBC America televised some matches.

References

External links

Official Site

 
2011 rugby union tournaments for national teams
2011
2010–11 in European rugby union
2010–11 in Irish rugby union
2010–11 in English rugby union
2010–11 in Welsh rugby union
2010–11 in Scottish rugby union
2010–11 in French rugby union
2010–11 in Italian rugby union
February 2011 sports events in Europe
March 2011 sports events in Europe
Royal Bank of Scotland